Rendezvous in Grenada (French: Rendez-vous à Grenade) is a 1951 French musical film directed by Richard Pottier and starring Luis Mariano, Nicole Maurey and Jean Tissier.

It was shot at the Photosonor Studios in Paris. The film's sets were designed by the art director Paul-Louis Boutié.

Cast
 Luis Mariano as Marco Da Costa 
 Nicole Maurey as Manina
 Jean Tissier as Maxime Saintal 
 Marthe Mercadier as Annette 
 Olivier Hussenot as Le chauffeur 
 Christiane Barry as La pompiste 
 Louis Bugette as Casimir 
 Zélie Yzelle as La dame qui traverse
 Paul Villé as Le valet 
 Les Bluebell Girls as Elles-mêmes - Ensemble 
 Lucien Hector
 Frédérique Nadar
 Janine Marsay
 Brigitte Bargès
 Henri Cote
 Gaston Garchery
 Jean Villet

References

Bibliography 
 Quinlan, David. The Illustrated Directory of Film Stars. Hippocrene Books, 1981.

External links 
 

1951 films
1951 musical films
French musical films
1950s French-language films
Films directed by Richard Pottier
French black-and-white films
1950s French films